James Arthur Hutchinson (28 December 1915 – 1997) was an English footballer who spent the 1940s with Sheffield United, Bournemouth & Boscombe Athletic, Lincoln City and Oldham Athletic. He was the father of Barry Hutchinson, who was a footballer in the 1950s and 1960s. Both father and son finished a season as Lincoln City's top-scorer.

Career
Hutchinson played for Aqueduct and Sheffield United before the outbreak of World War II, in which he guested for Bradford City, the Royal Navy, Lincoln City, Hull City and Port Vale. After the war he moved on to Harry Kinghorn's Bournemouth & Boscombe Athletic, scoring three goals in eight Third Division South games in 1946–47. He left Dean Court and spent the 1947–48 season with Lincoln City, and scored 21 league goals as Bill Anderson's "Imps" won the Third Division North title by a one-point margin over Rotherham United. However Lincoln were relegated out of the Second Division in last place in 1948–49, and Hutchinson left Sincil Bank. He spent the 1949–50 campaign with Oldham Athletic, scoring three goals in 14 Third Division North appearances for Billy Wootton's "Latics". He never found another club in the Football League after leaving Boundary Park, and instead played non-league football for Denaby United.

Career statistics
Source:

References

1915 births
1997 deaths
Footballers from Sheffield
English footballers
Association football forwards
Sheffield United F.C. players
Bradford City A.F.C. wartime guest players
Lincoln City F.C. wartime guest players
Hull City A.F.C. wartime guest players
Port Vale F.C. wartime guest players
AFC Bournemouth players
Lincoln City F.C. players
Oldham Athletic A.F.C. players
Denaby United F.C. players
English Football League players
20th-century Royal Navy personnel